Pamela B. Davis is a pediatric pulmonologist specializing in cystic fibrosis research. She has been Dean of the School of Medicine at Case Western Reserve University since 2007. She was elected to the Institute of Medicine in 2014.

References

Members of the National Academy of Medicine
Year of birth missing (living people)
Living people
American pulmonologists
21st-century American women scientists
Duke University alumni
Case Western Reserve University faculty
Case Western Reserve University administrators
21st-century American scientists
American women academics